Rafael Bertrand (20 August 1917 – 5 October 1983) was a Cuban film actor who worked for many years in the Mexican film industry. He played a Mexican version of the gentleman thief A. J. Raffles in the 1958 film Raffles.

Filmography

References

Bibliography
 Hardy, Phil. The BFI Companion to Crime. A&C Black, 1997.

External links

1917 births
1983 deaths
Cuban male film actors
Cuban emigrants to Mexico
20th-century Cuban male actors